Quantification may refer to:

 Quantification (science), the act of counting and measuring
 Quantification (machine learning), the task of estimating class prevalence values in unlabelled data
 Quantifier (linguistics), an indicator of quantity
 Quantifier (logic)